Albert James Smith Copp (December 19, 1866 –October 8, 1912) was a Canadian politician.

Born in Amherst, Nova Scotia, the son of Thomas Copp, Copp was educated in Amherst Academy, Dorchester and Sackville, New Brunswick. He was called to the Bar of Nova Scotia in 1879. Copp practised law in Digby. He was a crown prosecutor for the County of Digby from 1887 to 1910. He served as Commercial Agent for Canada in Boston in 1910. He was first elected to the House of Commons of Canada for the electoral district of Digby in the general elections of 1896. A Liberal, he was re-elected in 1900 and 1904. He was defeated in 1908.

In 1881, he married Eliza Dennison.

References

1866 births
1912 deaths
Liberal Party of Canada MPs
Members of the House of Commons of Canada from Nova Scotia
Lawyers in Nova Scotia